Sir Robert Pigot, 2nd Baronet (20 September 1720 – 1 August 1796) was a British Army officer during the American Revolutionary War.

Life
Robert Pigot was born in London, England in 1720. His two brothers were George Pigot, 1st Baron Pigot, Governor of Madras, India and Admiral Hugh Pigot, Commander-in-Chief of the West Indies fleet. He and his brothers shared Huguenot ancestry through their grandfather Peter Godde, who had come to England in the late seventeenth century.

In 1758 Pigot was major in the 10th Regiment of Foot. In 1764 he was lieutenant colonel. From 1769 to 1775 he was the commander of the 38th Regiment of Foot.

He also served as a member of parliament for Wallingford from 1768 to 1772. He was appointed Warden of the Mint from August, 1771 until his death.

On 17 June 1775 he commanded the left flank of the British assault in the Battle of Bunker Hill. On 9 July he was colonel in the 55th Regiment of Foot. He was promoted to the permanent grade of colonel for his bravery in the battle of Bunker Hill. He was made a major general in 1777. Pigot was placed in command in Rhode Island and made a lieutenant general in 1782. In the Battle of Rhode Island he fought with 3,000 men against 5,000 men under General John Sullivan. He inherited the baronetcy of his older brother Lord George Pigot (it had been created with special remainder) and the Patshull Hall estate in 1777. He also inherited a one-third share of the Pigot Diamond, which remained in the family until sold in a lottery in 1801. On 8 February he resigned and died 1 August 1796 in Stafford, England.

References

1720 births
1796 deaths
Military personnel from London
Baronets in the Baronetage of Great Britain
British Army generals
British Army personnel of the American Revolutionary War
Huguenot participants in the American Revolution
Members of the Parliament of Great Britain for English constituencies
British MPs 1768–1774
Royal Lincolnshire Regiment officers
55th Regiment of Foot officers